The Rithala metro station is a terminal station of the Red Line of Delhi Metro. It is an elevated station and is located in Rithala, Sector 5, Rohini in Delhi, India. The station was inaugurated on 31 March 2004.

It is within walking distance from Metro Walk and Adventure Island.

Station layout

See also
List of Delhi Metro stations
Transport in Delhi

References

External links

 Delhi Metro Rail Corporation Ltd. (Official site)

Delhi Metro stations
Railway stations opened in 2004
Railway stations in North West Delhi district
Buildings and structures in Delhi
Transport in Delhi
2004 establishments in Delhi